Enefiok Essien  (SAN) (born 29 January 1960 in Ibiono-Ibom, Akwa Ibom) is a Nigerian professor, lawyer and Was the Vice Chancellor of the University of Uyo.

Background 
Enefiok Effiong Essien was born on 29 January 1960 in Ibiono-Ibom local government of Akwa Ibom. He was born into the family of Effiong Okon and Ayie-Ubok James Essien.

Education 
In 1984, he graduated with a Bachelor of Laws with honors from the University Calabar, Nigeria. In 1985 he attended Nigerian Law School, Lagos and graduated with Business Level law degree and in 1988 he attended University of Lagos and graduated with a Master of Laws.

In 1998 he obtained a Doctor of Philosophy in law from University Birmingham, England.

Career 
He is a lawyer, professor of law and the immediate past Vice Chancellor of University of Uyo.

Scandal 
In 2005, he was indicted by the Court of Appeal, Calabar of sexual misconduct against a student after expulsion from Uniuyo. During the period of the incident Enefiok Essien who was the invigilator and also head of the examination malpractice panel allegedly swayed vote against the female student involved. The court of appeal after asking Enefiok to swear an affidavit to counter the student's accusation refused, with accusations against him not being challenged the court took a unanimous decision that he was guilty of sexual misconduct and tampering with examination panel. After several investigations and hearings he was exonerated.

Almost ten years after the incident he was appointed Vice Chancellor of University of Uyo by Kimse Okoko.

Awards and nominations 
 Senior Advocate of Nigeria, SAN.

References 

1960 births
Living people
People from Akwa Ibom State
University of Uyo people